Dewar is a village by the Dewar Burn and Peatrig Hill, in the Scottish Borders area of Scotland.

Places nearby include Allanshaugh, Borthwick Hall, Fountainhall, Garvald, Gladhouse Reservoir, Heriot, the Heriot Water, the Leithen Water, Lugate and the Lugate Water.

See also
List of places in the Scottish Borders
List of places in Scotland

References

External links
CANMORE/RCAHMS record of 'Lot's Wife', Dewar Hill
Geograph image: Dewar Hill

Villages in the Scottish Borders